The 2009 Sylvania 300 was the twenty-seventh stock car race of the 2009 NASCAR Sprint Cup Series and the first in the ten-race season-ending Chase for the Sprint Cup. It was held on September 20, 2009, at New Hampshire Motor Speedway in Loudon, New Hampshire, before a crowd of 101,000 people. The 300-lap race was won by Mark Martin of the Hendrick Motorsports team after starting from fourteenth position. Denny Hamlin of Joe Gibbs Racing finished second and Earnhardt Ganassi Racing's Juan Pablo Montoya was in third place.

Martin was leading the Drivers' Championship heading into the race because of a redistribution of the points-scoring system that saw him receive an additional forty points for achieving four race victories in the preceding 26 events. Montoya, who initially held the pole position by recording the fastest lap time in qualifying, was immediately passed by Tony Stewart. One lap later, Montoya reclaimed the lead. Chase for the Sprint Cup participants Hamlin and Kurt Busch were in the top ten for most of the race. Martin became the leader of the race, after the leaders made their pit stops. Martin retained the first position to win the race, his fifth of the 2009 season. There were eleven cautions and twenty lead changes among ten different drivers during the race.

The race was Martin's fifth win of the season, as well as the 40th and final win of his Cup career. After the race, Martin maintained his lead in the Drivers' Championship, thirty-five points ahead of Hamlin, who advanced to second, and equal on points with Johnson. Chevrolet maintained its lead in the Manufacturers' Championship, thirty-nine points ahead of Toyota and eighty-one ahead of Dodge, with nine races of the season remaining. The race attracted 5.04 million television viewers.

Background 

The 2009 Sylvania 300 was the twenty-seventh of thirty-six scheduled stock car races of the 2009 NASCAR Sprint Cup Series and the first in the ten-race season-ending Chase for the Sprint Cup. It was held on September 20, 2009, in Loudon, New Hampshire, at New Hampshire Motor Speedway, an intermediate track that holds NASCAR races. The track's turns are banked at two to seven degrees, while the front stretch, the finish line, and the back stretch are banked at one degree.

Before the race, twelve drivers gained qualification to the Chase for the Sprint Cup; each of them had no fewer than 5,000 points and those who won races over the course of the season received an additional ten points. This was done through a redistribution of the points system. Mark Martin led the Drivers' Championship with 5,040 points by virtue of his four victories in the preceding 26 races, followed by Tony Stewart and Jimmie Johnson who were tied for second place on 5,030 points. Denny Hamlin, was 5,020 points, was tied with Kasey Kahne, with Jeff Gordon, Kurt Busch and Brian Vickers all level with 5,010 points. Carl Edwards, Ryan Newman, Juan Pablo Montoya and Greg Biffle rounded out the top twelve with 5,000 points each. In the Manufacturers' Championship, Chevrolet was leading with 190 points, thirty-six points ahead of their rival Toyota in second. Dodge and Ford were tied on points in the battle for third place. Biffle was the race's defending champion.

Johnson had qualified for all six previous Chase for the Sprint Cups and spoke of his expectations, "I think we’ve got our best chance for a really exciting Chase. We’re really running well. I feel really good at the races in the Chase." Martin commented on his prospects, "I feel like a whole new person — a huge weight is off my shoulders. To make this thing is the icing and now we get to go race for the cake." Montoya was the first non-American driver to advance to the Chase for the Sprint Cup, and said he felt he was under no pressure to be in it, adding, "If I win the Cup, cool. That's it. That's not a big deal for me. I don't get any special treatment or anything. I wouldn't mind getting some but I don't."

Practice and qualifying 

Three practice sessions were held before the Sunday race—one on Friday, and two on Saturday. The first session lasted 90 minutes, and the second 45 minutes. The final session lasted 60 minutes. During the first practice session, Montoya was fastest with a lap of 28.749 seconds, placing ahead of Kevin Harvick in second and Clint Bowyer in third. Stewart took fourth position, and Martin placed fifth. Kurt Busch, A. J. Allmendinger, Kyle Busch, Johnson and Hamlin rounded out the top ten fastest drivers in the session.

A total of forty-five drivers were entered in the qualifier on Friday afternoon; due to NASCAR's qualifying procedure,  forty-three were allowed to race. Each driver ran two laps, with the starting order determined by the competitor's fastest times. On his second timed lap, Montoya clinched his second pole position of the season and of his career, with a track-record lap of 28.545 seconds. He was joined on the grid's front row by Stewart. Kurt Busch qualified third and Hamlin took fourth after holding pole position for most of the season. Edwards started fifth. David Stremme was the fastest driver who was unable to advance for the Chase for the Sprint Cup in sixth. Martin Truex Jr., Bobby Labonte and Kyle Busch completed the top nine qualifiers. Jeff Gordon, one of the drivers in the Chase for the Sprint Cup, qualified tenth, while Kahne set the eleventh-fastest time. The two drivers who failed to qualify for the race were Derrike Cope and Dexter Bean. After the qualifier Montoya said, "You know how these races go, "If it was a 10-lap shootout, I'll say, 'Hey, we're looking good.' But it's like 200 laps, 300 laps or something, or 400, I don't even know. It's a bunch of laps. As long as I lead the last one I don't care."

On Saturday morning, Montoya was fastest in the second practice session with a 29.269 seconds lap, ahead of Truex in second, and Martin in third. Stremme was fourth quickest, and Johnson took fifth. Hamlin managed sixth. Kurt Busch, Biffle, Labonte and Kahne followed in the top ten. Of the other drivers in the Chase, Stewart was eighteenth-fastest, while Edwards ended with twenty-third-fastest time. Later that day, Montoya paced the final practice session with a time of  29.214 seconds, ahead of Truex in second and Kurt Busch in third. Martin was fourth-fastest, ahead of Johnson and Dale Earnhardt Jr. Hamlin was seventh-fastest, Jeff Gordon eighth-, Harvick ninth- and Stewart tenth-fastest. Other Chase drivers included Kahne in fourteenth and Biffle in twentieth.

Qualifying results

Race 
The race commenced at 1:00 p.m. Eastern Daylight Time and was televised live in the United States on ESPN. Commentary was provided by play-by-play announcer Jerry Punch, with analysis by Dale Jarrett and Andy Petree. Bishop Michael Cote began pre-race ceremonies with the invocation. Universal Music Group Nashville recording artist Josh Turner performed the national anthem, and Tim Leach, Vice President of Sales, Service and Logistics for Sylvania, gave the command for drivers to start their engines. During the pace laps, Tony Raines had to move to the back of the grid because of him changing his engine.

Stewart accelerated faster than Montoya off the line, getting ahead of him going into the first turn. One lap later, Montoya reclaimed the lead by passing Stewart in turn one. Stremme moved into fourth on lap three, while Hamlin passed Stewart for the second position. Vickers, who began the race in twenty-sixth, had moved up seven positions to nineteenth by lap five. By the sixth lap, Montoya had increased his lead over Stewart to 1.4 seconds. Five laps later, Jeff Gordon moved into sixth position, while Edwards passed Labonte for eighth. By lap 15, Montoya had a 2.3-second lead over Stewart. Seven laps later, Stewart had reduced Montoya's lead to 1.1 seconds.

On lap 24, Dave Blaney took his car to the garage because of an electrical problem. Seven laps later, Truex lost three positions after running seventh. On lap 37, Stewart reclaimed the lead from Montoya. On the 39th lap, Michael McDowell drove to the garage because of brake problems. During the 43rd lap, Jeff Gordon passed Hamlin for fourth position. After starting the race in twenty-third, Earnhardt moved up into fifteenth position by lap 46. Four laps later, Stremme dropped to sixth position, after being passed by Edwards and Johnson. On lap 51, Jeff Gordon passed Hamlin for the fourth position, while Mike Wallace took his car to the garage because of brake problems. By lap 56, Harvick and Labonte were running in nineteenth and twentieth, while Stewart's lead was 1.7 seconds by lap 63. 

Three laps later, Kahne felt something rough on the backstretch and his car suffered an engine problem with smoke billowing from the front of his car while on the frontstretch; the issue was found to have been caused by crankshaft failure and it forced his retirement from the race. This caused the deployment of the first caution of the event during the 67th lap. During the caution, all of the leaders elected to make pit stops. Montoya reclaimed the lead during the caution and maintained it at the restart on the 75th lap. Jeff Gordon passed Martin for the seventh position on lap 79. By the 83rd lap, Montoya's lead was 1.8 seconds over Stewart. Two laps later, the second caution was given because of debris on the track at turn three. None of the leaders elected to make pit stops. Montoya maintained his lead at the restart, followed by Stewart and Hamlin.

Stewart fell to fifth after contact with Hamlin on lap 92, allowing Kurt Busch to move into second position one lap later. On lap 95, Jeff Gordon passed Truex for twelfth position. By lap 101, Montoya had a lead of 1.2 seconds. Kurt Busch managed to close the gap to Montoya by 0.7 seconds by lap 110. On the 113th lap, Jeff Gordon passed Vickers to claim eleventh. Twelve laps later, Kurt Busch claimed the lead off Montoya. Five laps later, Jeff Gordon moved up to ninth, while Newman and Vickers moved up to tenth and eleventh respectively. On lap 131, Earnhardt passed Martin for the tenth position. By lap 138, Kurt Busch had a 2.4-second lead over Montoya.

On lap 141, the third caution was given as debris was spotted on the track. During the caution, all of the leaders made pit stops. At the lap 146 restart. Montoya became the leader, ahead of Hamlin and Kurt Busch. Two laps later, Hamlin moved into first, one lap after colliding with Montoya. On lap 153, Montoya reclaimed the lead through turn four. Five laps later, Johnson passed Martin for the sixth position. Three laps later, the fourth caution was given after Erik Darnell spun sideways in turn two. Most of the leaders made pit stops. As David Ragan was entering his pit stall, the left-rear quarter of his car was struck by Kurt Busch, sending Ragan into a 180-degree backwards spin as his pit crew were about to service him. Ragan was permitted to have four tires and fuel since his pit stop complied with NASCAR standards. Kurt Busch sustained minor damage to the nose of his vehicle. Stewart became the leader at the lap 166 restart. Two laps after the restart, the fifth caution was given as a multi-car collision occurred, as Joey Logano and Elliott Sadler collided, collecting Paul Menard, Michael Waltrip, Robby Gordon and John Andretti.

Stewart led on the lap 175 restart; the sixth caution was given on the following lap as Jeff Burton spun sideways but avoided hitting anything. At the lap 181 restart, Stewart was the leader, ahead of Johnson, Newman, Earnhardt and Hamlin. On the next lap, Johnson claimed the lead through turn one, while Sam Hornish Jr. went to his garage due to oil issues. Two laps later, Earnhardt and Montoya moved up into third and fifth positions respectively. Five laps later, Montoya passed McMurray for the fourth position; Earnhardt passed Stewart for second. By the 190th lap, Johnson had a lead of three seconds, while Montoya passed Stewart for third. On lap 193, Allmendinger made contact with Stremme who spun into the wall at turn two, prompting the seventh caution. Most of the leaders made pit stops during the caution. Kurt Busch became the leader by the lap 197 restart, from Martin and Sadler.

Burton and David Reutimann moved into third and fourth respectively after passing Sadler on lap 199. Five laps later, Martin passed Kurt Busch to claim the lead. On lap 208, Jeff Gordon had fallen to fourteenth position after minor contact with Johnson, while Hamlin and Montoya moved into fourth and sixth positions respectively. Three laps later, Montoya moved into fifth after passing Reutimann. On the 219th lap, Johnson passed Sadler for the seventh position. Nineteen laps later, Johnson passed Montoya to take over fifth, while Hamlin passed Burton to claim the second position. On lap 243, green flag pit stops began, as Martin was the first to pit, handing the lead back to Kurt Busch. On lap 248, Hamlin became the new race leader after Kurt Busch came into pit road. Kevin Harvick drove to pit road due to mechanical problems twenty-one laps later. 

On lap 272, Martin reclaimed the lead as the previous leaders had made their pit stops. Four laps later, the eighth caution was given because of debris on the track in turns three and four. Most of the drivers made pit stops during the caution, although Martin stayed out and remained the leader on the lap 283 restart. After the restart on the same lap, the ninth caution was given after Reutimann was battling Earnhardt for fifth position on the inside and made contact with Earnhardt, causing Earnhardt to collide with the barrier between turns three and four. At the lap 288 restart, Martin remained the leader ahead of Kurt Busch. One lap later, Montoya moved up into third after passing Hamlin and Johnson. On lap 289, Montoya passed Kurt Busch at the first turn for the second position. One lap later, Kurt Busch lost a further position when he was passed by Hamlin. On lap 292, Martin had a 1.1-second lead. Two laps later, the tenth caution came out after Allmendinger spun in turn two after he made contact with Marcos Ambrose. 

Martin led on the restart on lap 298, followed by Montoya and Hamlin. He was driving on the outside lane and he placed Montoya on the inside to the bottom of the track to halt his momentum. Hamlin overtook Montoya for second during the final lap. On the same lap, Allmendinger lost control of his car at the exit of the fourth turn, and spun sideways on the frontstretch. Allmendinger's car rolled slowly backward and stopped perpendicular to the circuit. Officials waited for most of the last lap to deploy the race's eleventh and final caution, when the race leaders were in-between the third and fourth turns, because they had anticipated Allmendinger being able to drive away before the completion of the race. Allmendinger was able to restart his car just as the race leaders exited the final corner; smoke emitted from Allmendinger's spinning rear tires created visibility issues. Martin was informed of the caution by his spotter and he slowed leaving the final turn as Montoya drove to the inside of Allmendinger. The field was frozen, with the finishing order determined by where the drivers were running at the moment of caution. Thus, Martin achieved his fifth victory of the 2009 season and 40th of his career. Hamlin finished second, with Montoya in third, Johnson in fourth, and Kyle Busch in fifth. Kurt Busch, Newman, Sadler, Biffle and Bowyer rounded out the top ten finishers. There were twenty-eight lead changes among ten different drivers during the race. Montoya led four times for a total of 105 laps, more than any other driver. Martin led twice for a total of 68 laps.

Post-race 

Martin appeared in victory lane to celebrate his fifth win of the season, in front of 101,000 who attended the race. Martin also earned $232,750 in race winnings. Martin was delighted with his victory: "Alan [Gustafson] won the race, Alan's the man. This is a dream come true. ... We still have the lotto at Talladega [Nov. 1], and [I] think we'll run OK at Martinsville. We finished [seventh] in the spring, but I don't run good there – but this is my hardest place. It's a tough place." Martin also argued that his driving did not cause the final caution: "Once you got the lead, you need to make sure you don't drive it in there and turn it sideways (and) slide it up the racetrack. I mean, how stupid would I look then?" Hamlin commented that he was at an disadvantage when restarting on the outside lane but that finishing second made him "pretty proud". Montoya was somewhat frustrated with the result, saying: "Martin just screwed me – he just stopped the car on the apex, right on the bottom, and I had nowhere to go," Montoya said. "I could have pushed him out of the way ... but I respect him a lot."

Drivers expressed their concerns over the finish of the race. Gordon said that he was not told that a caution was deployed, "I saw the caution out of the corner of my eye. I said, 'I never heard the caution' and [my spotter] said, 'That's because it didn't come out until just now,' and I was surprised by that." Johnson felt that the caution should have been brought out earlier. He said that he did not know whose fault it was but suggested that a caution alert system with a small yellow light illuminating inside the car when a caution is deployed similar to that in Formula One be implemented to avoid such situations in the future. Martin commented that Hamlin and Montoya who were behind him did not appear to be aware of the situation, adding, "I was under the impression that when a caution [was] called, the race was over. I don't think the guys [who] gave up the race behind me quit, so it caused a little bit of chaos." NASCAR spokesperson Ramsey R. Poston stated that NASCAR waited as long as possible to allow for the race to end until the caution was deployed. Robin Pemberton, NASCAR's vice-president of competition, said that the organization disliked concluding events under caution and that they waited for as long as possible to avoid affecting the race's result. 

The race result kept Martin in the lead of the Drivers' Championship with 5,230 points. Hamlin moved into second, tied on points with Johnson on 5,195, twenty points ahead of Montoya and thirty ahead of Kurt Busch. Chevrolet maintained their Manufacturers' Championship lead with 199 points. Toyota remained second with 160 points. Dodge moved to third with 118 and Ford fell to fourth with 117. There were 5.04 million television viewers. The race took three hours, nine minutes and one second to complete; because it ended under caution, no margin of victory was recorded.

Three days after the race, Joe Gibbs Racing were given penalties for Kyle Busch's car. Joe Gibbs Racing's penalty, for unauthorized alterations to the ride height of Kyle Busch's car, included a fine of $25,000 for crew chief Steve Addington, and the loss of 25 owner and driver points for Joe Gibbs and Kyle Busch respectively. Addington was also placed on probation until December 31, 2009. The team clarified that the left-front spring on Kyle Busch's car became dislodged and this caused the car's left-front quarter to run lower than usual; it required an alteration to the vehicle's handling to compensate for the change. They accepted NASCAR decision on the problem. Kyle Busch's standing in the Drivers' Championship was unaffected.

Race results

Standings after the race 

Drivers' Championship standings

Manufacturers' Championship standings

Note: Only the top twelve positions are included for the driver standings. These drivers qualified for the Chase for the Sprint Cup.

References 

Sylvania 300
Sylvania 300
NASCAR races at New Hampshire Motor Speedway
September 2009 sports events in the United States